Mohammad Keramat Ali (1926-2004) was a Bangladesh Nationalist Party politician and the former Member of Parliament of Patuakhali-1.

Career
Ali was elected to parliament from Patuakhali-1 as a Bangladesh Nationalist Party candidate in 1991.

References

Bangladesh Nationalist Party politicians
2004 deaths
5th Jatiya Sangsad members
1926 births